This is a list of the Palestine national football team results from 1998 to 2009.

Results

1998

1999

2000

2001

2002

2003

2004

2006

2007

2008

2009

Notes

References

External links
 Palestine fixtures on FIFA.com
 Palestine fixtures on eloratings.net
 RSSSF: Palestine – International Results

1990s in the Palestinian territories
2000s in the Palestinian territories
1998-2009